For the actual machine, see fog machine.

Smoke Machine is the second and final album by Chocolate USA. It was released in 1994 on Bar/None Records.

The band, always more a project of Julian Koster, broke up after the release of the album. Smoke Machine contains some of Bill Doss's earliest recorded performances.

Critical reception
AllMusic wrote: "While every melody and song is catchy as hell, and although Kostner's vocals are tender, this is pop music at its most exploratory without aspiring to (yet not sacrificing) accessibility. The whole of it is unselfconscious brilliance." Trouser Press also praised it, and wrote that it "retains the determinedly unpretentious vibe of the first album, but the songwriting and arrangements are surer and more fully realized."

Track listing
 USA: Milkiest Theme
 Bookbag
 My Cherry Bomb
 Another Lego In Tha Cross
 (Unlisted Track)
 The Boy Who Stuck His Head In The Dryer (And Whirl'd Round N' Round)
 Intermission
 Playing In The Mud
 Ugly Girl
 Milk (Theme)
 Isn't A Lie.../Glow Worm
 We Stole The Cow
 (Bonus Tracks From Chocolate Monthly Tapes)

Personnel
Bill Doss - "multi instruments"
Julian Koster - vocals, guitar, bass, piano, drums, viola, concertina
Liza Wakeman - violin

References

1994 albums